is a public park located in Takayama, Gifu Prefecture, Japan. In 1873, the park was established in the mountainous area around the ruins of Takayama Castle. The park's name means "castle mountain."

Outline
It has over 1,000 Yoshino cherry trees and is popular in the spring time when they are in bloom.

References

 

Parks and gardens in Gifu Prefecture
Takayama, Gifu